The Belgian railway line 25 is the oldest railway line in Belgium. It connects Belgium's two main cities: Brussels and Antwerp. The section between Brussels and Mechelen was completed in on 5 May 1835 and was the first railway in Belgium and the first public passenger steam railway on the European continent. On 3 May 1836 the second section, between Mechelen and Antwerp, was opened. It was extended to Luchtbal in the north of Antwerp in 2007 in order to shorten the route from Amsterdam to Brussels. The total line runs .

Over most of its length it is paralleled by  so that four tracks are available. During business hours, line 25 serves fast trains while local trains use line 27.

The line goes through the following stations:
 Brussels-North
 Schaarbeek
 
 Vilvoorde
 Eppegem
 Weerde
 Mechelen
 Mechelen-Nekkerspoel
 Sint-Katelijne-Waver
 Duffel
 Kontich
 Hove
 Mortsel-Oude-God
 Mortsel-Deurnesteenweg
 Antwerpen-Berchem
 Antwerpen-Central
 Antwerpen-Luchtbal

L25N
A recent addition is line 25N, which branches off south of Mechelen to follow the E19 motorway into the Diabolo to Brussels National Airport. As of 2019, works are underway to extend this line 25N through the Mechelen station, adding two platforms, to rejoin the "regular" line 25 North of Nekkerspoel station.

References

  Local language network overview

25
25
Rail transport in Antwerp
Mechelen
Railway lines opened in 1835
Standard gauge railways in Belgium